William Craig Lawing (July 6, 1925 – June 10, 1999) was a member of the North Carolina House of Representatives (1971–1976) and of the North Carolina Senate (1977–1984) representing Mecklenburg County, and served as President Pro Tempore of the North Carolina Senate for three terms (1979–1984). While a senator, Lawing was a sponsor of the Equal Rights Amendment, which the legislature rejected.

Lawing was the longest-serving president pro tem of the state senate until Marc Basnight.

He died in 1999.

References

Term Limits for legislative leaders? by Jack Betts

1925 births
Democratic Party members of the North Carolina House of Representatives
Democratic Party North Carolina state senators
People from Mecklenburg County, North Carolina
1999 deaths
20th-century American politicians